"" is the national anthem of Iraq, being adopted as such in 2004.

The song formerly served as an unofficial anthem of Palestine from the late 1930s Palestinian Arab revolt to 1996, when the country formally adopted an official national anthem. Though it has since been superseded by an official national anthem there, many Palestinians still identify strongly with it and consider it an unofficial second national anthem of their country. It is considered one of the Arab national anthems.

History

It is a popular poem written by the Palestinian poet ʾIbrāhīm Ṭūqān c. 1934 and composed by the Lebanese composer Muḥammid Flayfil. It served as Palestine's de facto national anthem from its inception to 1996 when it was officially replaced by "Fidā'ī". However, many Palestinians still identify with it along with "Fida'i" and consider the former a sort of unofficial second national anthem of their country.

In 2004, it was re-adopted as a national anthem, this time by Iraq, on the order of Coalition Provisional Authority chief Paul Bremer as the national anthem of Iraq. It replaced "Mawṭinī" (of no relation to the current national anthem), which in turn replaced the old national anthem "Arḍulfurātayni", which had been in use since 1981 and was thus associated with Saddam Hussein's Ba'athist regime.

Background
During the late 1950s and early 1960s, after it became a republic, Iraq used a national anthem also called "Mawṭinī", composed by Lewis Zanbaka. Though it shares the same name as the current Iraqi national anthem, it is a different song altogether. Unlike the current Iraqi national anthem, this version is instrumental and has no lyrics.

After Iraq's Ba'athist regime was deposed in 2003, the old "Mawṭinī" formerly used as the Iraqi national anthem during the late 1950s and early 1960s was brought back and used temporarily as an interim national anthem until it was replaced by the current "Mawṭinī" in 2004.

Lyrics

See also

"as-Salām al-Malakī", the former Iraqi national anthem, used from 1932 to 1958.
"ʾArḍ ul-Furātayn", the former Iraqi national anthem, used from 1981 to 2003.
"Humat ad-Diyar", anthem of Syria, also composed by Mohammed Flayfel.

Notes

References

External links

Information on Mawtini at NationalAnthems.me (archive link)
Ilham al Madfai – A free download of Iraqi singer Ilham al Madfai's version of "Mawtini" is available at his official website, from the CD "The Voice of Iraq"
Anthem Original Performance
Watch Mawtini sung by Algerian youth
Free download of Mawtini performed by Sgt. Brenda Bushera, a member of the 34th Red Bull Infantry Band
Listen to a Syrian version

Iraqi music
National symbols of Iraq
Asian anthems
National symbols of the State of Palestine
National anthem compositions in F minor
1934 songs